Crisler Center (formerly known as the University Events Building and Crisler Arena) is an indoor arena located in Ann Arbor, Michigan. It is the home arena for the University of Michigan's men's and women's basketball teams as well as its women's gymnastics team. Constructed in 1967, the arena seats 12,707 spectators. It is named for Herbert O. "Fritz" Crisler, head football coach at Michigan from 1938 to 1947 and athletic director thereafter until his retirement in 1968. Crisler Center was designed by Dan Dworsky, a member of the 1948 Rose Bowl team. Among other structures that he has designed is the Federal Reserve Bank of Los Angeles.

The arena is often called "The House that Cazzie Built", a reference to player Cazzie Russell, who starred on Michigan teams that won three consecutive Big Ten Conference titles from 1964 to 1966. Russell's popularity caused the team's fan base to outgrow Yost Fieldhouse (now Yost Ice Arena) and prompted the construction of the current facility.

At Michigan men's basketball games, the bleacher seats behind the benches are home to the Maize Rage student section.

Tenants
Crisler Center has been the home of Michigan Wolverines men's basketball since its opening in 1967. The women's basketball team has been at Crisler Center since 1974. It has also been the home of Michigan's wrestling, women's volleyball and men's gymnastics teams. The gymnastics team hosted events at Crisler Center from 1978 to 1989. The wrestling team called Crisler Center its home from 1967 to 1989. The women's gymnastics team competed at Crisler Center from 1978 to 1989 before moving to Cliff Keen Arena in 1990 before ultimately returning to Crisler Center as their primary home in 2004.

Other events

Despite being on a Big Ten Conference campus, the facility hosted the 1980–1982 Mid-American Conference men's basketball tournament. It has also hosted Big Ten and NCAA gymnastics championships, the 1999 Big Ten wrestling championship, and other events. Prior to the opening of Cliff Keen Arena, the arena was the full-time home to the men's and women's gymnastics teams and the wrestling team. The women's gymnastics team continues to hold significant meets in the arena.

The arena has also hosted concerts, including the opening show of Bruce Springsteen & The E Street Band's The River Tour. Elvis Presley performed at the arena on April 24, 1977.

Crisler Center was also the site of the famous "ten-for-two" John Sinclair Freedom Rally, featuring John Lennon & Yoko Ono in 1971.

The 2014 NCAA Men's Gymnastics championship was held at Crisler Center. Michigan's Men's Gymnastics team won their second consecutive national championship in that meet.

The arena has also hosted graduations, including Michigan’s Dearborn campus’ winter commencements every year.

Renovation
The University completed a massive renovation to the Crisler Center in 2011, in which the seats were replaced and capacity was reduced. A new scoreboard was added along with the construction of an athletic facility in between the arena and Michigan Stadium called the Junge Family Champions Center. Along with the Junge Center, the University added the Mortenson Family Plaza on the roof of the Junge Center. The outside walls were torn down and the concourse was expanded. A new grand entrance along with new boxes were expected to be ready by January 2013, but were completed just before the start of the 2012-13 Basketball season, much earlier than originally planned. The renovations also included renovations to the control room, updating the controllers for game stats and content for the University of Michigan football stadium and the Crisler Center.

Part of the Crisler renovation also included the construction of the William Davidson Player Development Center (WDPDC). The $23.2 million facility boasts 2 full courts with 10 baskets, weight room, sports medicine training room, and two identical wings for Men's and Women's basketball offices.

Gallery

See also
 List of NCAA Division I basketball arenas

References

External links

Official Crisler Center information page
Crisler Center at Stadium Journey

College basketball venues in the United States
Michigan Wolverines basketball venues
Basketball venues in Michigan
Sports venues completed in 1967
University of Michigan campus